The Vals River is a tributary of the Vaal River in the Free State, South Africa. It is a strong seasonal river.

This river of the Middle Vaal System is a good place for fishing, especially the local Largemouth Yellowfish.

Course
The river source is about 20 km southeast of Paul Roux and about 25 km southeast of Bethlehem. It flows under the N5 road shortly after its source. 
In its upper course the Vals River flows roughly northwards, bending northwestwards across the highveld towards Lindley and meandering across the plain.

In its middle course there are a number of weirs as it flows mostly through areas of dryland crops and its waters are used for irrigation. The Vals receives a number of small tributaries, the most important of which are the Blomspruit and the Liebenbergstroom. It finally meets the Vaal after crossing the city of Kroonstad.

Dams in its basin
Serfontein Dam, near Kroonstad
Barend Wessel Dam, by Kroonstad
Bloemhoek Dam, in the Jordaan Spruit

See also 
 List of rivers in South Africa

References

External links

Free State Region River Systems
Free State residents worried about sewage flowing into the Vals River

Vaal River
Rivers of the Free State (province)